The Estadio Superdomo de La Rioja is a multi-purpose indoor arena that is located in La Rioja, La Rioja Province, Argentina. The arena has a seating capacity of 13,000 people for concerts, and 11,000 people for basketball games. The arena can host numerous types of events, such as sports, cultural and musical shows, and public performances. It also features parking for 8,000 vehicles.

History
The Superdomo opened on December 10th, 2015. The arena was used to host home games of the senior men's Argentine national basketball team, during 2019 FIBA World Cup Americas qualifiers.

See also
 List of indoor arenas in Argentina

References

External links
Estadio Superdomo at worldstadiums.com 
Estadio Superdomo at estadiosdeargentina.com.ar 

Basketball venues in Argentina
La Rioja Province, Argentina
Indoor arenas in Argentina
Music venues in Argentina
Volleyball venues in Argentina